Damnation and a Day (subtitled From Genesis to Nemesis...) is the fifth studio album by English extreme metal band Cradle of Filth. It was released on 10 March 2003 and is Cradle of Filth's only album on a major label, Sony Records, after which they transferred to Roadrunner. It features the one hundred and one-piece Budapest Film Orchestra including the forty-piece Budapest Film Choir. The album is partly based on John Milton's epic poem Paradise Lost.

Background 
In addition to the Miltonic arc, the album also features stand-alone tracks such as the Nile tribute "Doberman Pharaoh" and the Aleister Crowley-influenced "Babalon A.D. (So Glad for the Madness)".

Recording 
This is the first Cradle of Filth release since V Empire to feature only one full-time guitar player (Paul Allender), as former guitarist Gian Pyres quit the band shortly before the writing and recording process. Keyboardist Martin Powell played session guitars for the album as well as keyboards. This is also the first album to feature Dave Pybus on bass. He would go on to play on all of Cradle's subsequent releases until 2012. Narration on the first track of each section is by David McEwen, who played Kemper in the 2001 horror film Cradle of Fear (also starring Cradle frontman Dani Filth) and appeared in the video for "Her Ghost in the Fog", miming Doug Bradley's vocals.

A cover of Cliff Richard's "Devil Woman" was originally recorded during the Damnation and a Day sessions, but only surfaced on the special edition of Nymphetamine in 2005, re-recorded, with some of the lyrics altered ("feminine ways" became "nymphetamine ways").

The album's recording process was documented on Cradle's 2005 video release Peace Through Superior Firepower.

Videos 
The album spawned two DVD singles for the songs "Babalon A.D. (So Glad for the Madness)" and "Mannequin". The former was directed by Wiz (who had previously worked with Marilyn Manson), and was modelled on Pier Paolo Pasolini's film Salò; an adaptation of the Marquis de Sade's The 120 Days of Sodom. The latter, reminiscent of the films of Jan Švankmajer, was directed by Thomas Mignone, and featured stop motion animation by George Higham.

Critical reception 

Damnation and a Day received a mixed response from critics. AllMusic wrote, "[Damnation and a Day] has some grand-sounding moments, and is recorded cleanly, with the symphonic and operatic elements being perhaps its best. But it is endless, and only a true Filth fan could tell one song from another", ultimately calling it a "taxing, less-than-monumental work that won't win them many new mainstream fans, if that's at all what they had in mind." Influential extreme metal website Chronicles of Chaos wrote, "The songs are lengthy without exception, exploring multiple motifs, but the quality has been stretched out to breaking point. Whereas Midian offered us glossy slabs of great atmospheric metal, Damnation serves up overblown constructions that only capture your interest in sporadic bursts", before finishing with, "It is a real shame that Cradle's mainstream label debut should sound this misguided; one can painfully hear the effort that has been put into making Damnation and a Day a reality. What will sadden most CoF devotees is the reality that the insidious atmosphere that suffused The Principle of Evil Made Flesh through to Dusk... and Her Embrace has all but disappeared".

Track listing

Personnel

Cradle of Filth 
 Dani Filth – vocals
 Paul Allender – lead guitar
 Martin Powell – keyboards, violin, rhythm guitar
 Dave Pybus – bass
 Adrian Erlandsson – drums
 Sarah Jezebel Deva – backing vocals

Additional personnel 
 The Budapest Film Orchestra and Choir conducted by László Zádori
 David McEwen – narration on all "Intro" tracks except "The Mordant Liquor of Tears" and "A Scarlet Witch Lit the Season"
 Madame Slam – additional vocals

Production
 Doug Cook – producer, engineer, mixing engineer
 Dan Turner – assistant engineer
 Rob Caggiano – mixing with Cradle of Filth
 Steve Regina – mixing engineer
 Daniel Presley – orchestral arrangement
 John Coulthart – album sleeve illustration and design
 Stu Williamson – sleeve photography
 Sugar Babes – models
 Samantha Bond – model

Charts

Album

Singles

References

External links 
 

Cradle of Filth albums
2003 albums
Concept albums
Sony Music albums
Epic Records albums